Swimming at the 2015 European Youth Summer Olympic Festival was held in July 2015 in Tbilisi, Georgia.

Medal events

Boys' events

Girls' events

Mixed events

References

European Youth Summer Olympic Festival
Swimming
Swimming in Georgia (country)
2015